Hild is a 2013 historical novel and the sixth novel by British author Nicola Griffith. Hild is a fictionalized telling of the life of Hilda of Whitby, also known as Hild of Streoneshalh, a significant figure in Anglo-Saxon Britain. The book includes a map, a glossary of terms, and a pronunciation guide.

The novel was first published in the United States by Farrar, Straus and Giroux on November 12, 2013 and in the United Kingdom on October 4, 2014 through Blackfriars Books. Griffith has stated that the book will be the first in a trilogy and that the second book will be titled Menewood.

Novel summary
In seventh-century Britain, small kingdoms are merging. Edwin of Northumbria plots to become the king of all the Angles through force, bribery, and religious coercion. The king's niece Hild grows up bright, curious, and willful in this world of violence and mysticism. She learns to fight with staff and sword and to speak several languages. Although her father has been assassinated, Hild survives to become an advisor to the king and ultimately to other major figures determining England's course in the Early Middle Ages.

Development
Prior to writing Hild, Griffith began researching Hild and seventh-century Britain, upon which she realized that not much was known about Hild as a historical person. Griffith documented her research on her blog Gemæcce and during this process she began wondering about aspects of Hild's life not recorded historically, such as her likes, dislikes, and reasons for choosing specific actions. While writing the character Griffith posited that she had two types of close personal relationship with women outside of her immediate family: her sexual partner and her gemæcce. Griffith created the grammatically feminine term gemæcce from the Old English masculine word gemæcca meaning "mate, equal, one of a pair, comrade, companion" and "husband or wife", which she repurposed to refer to a female friend and work partner.

As Hild was female and held a position in her uncle's court, Griffith realized that it would be possible for Hild to have sexual partners of either sex. Women of Hild's station would have to worry primarily about being discreet and careful about whom they selected. However Griffith also stated that:

Griffith also stated that she wanted to write the book in an immersive style in order to let the reader "experience the seventh century, to see, smell, hear, taste and feel what Hild does; to gradually adopt her mindset and worldview; to think as she does, to learn her lessons, feel her joys—to be her, just for a little while."

Reception
Critical reception for Hild has been positive and many compared the work to Dame Hilary Mantel's Wolf Hall. American historical novelist Cecelia Holland wrote in Locus Magazine that "Griffith’s description of how the little girl Hild foretells some events is deftly done [...] In dealing with the history the book is less effective, and for an interesting reason. Contrast this novel with Hillary Mantel’s Wolf Hall, which also treats a huge political landscape from the perspective of one character." Mantel could take advantage of the popularity of Tudor history and "never had to describe the ins and outs of Tudor politics; she could incorporate whole masses of data by a simple reference. ... Griffith has nothing like this. Very few people know anything at all" about fifth-century politics, historical figures, and linguistics. "So all this data falls on Hild to divulge, the whole tangle of little kingdoms, the people with names like Coelfrith... and Eadfrith..., the family feuds and the religious undercurrents..."

In contrast a reviewer for the Chicago Tribune wrote that the book had more in common with T. H. White's The Once and Future King and George R. R. Martin's Game of Thrones than with Wolf Hall. Amal El-Mohtar gave the work high praise in an NPR article, writing "Hild is a book as loving as it is fierce, brilliant and accomplished. To read it felt like a privilege and a gift."

The work also received praise from Publishers Weekly, who named it one of their "Books of the Week" for November 11, 2013, and the Seattle Times, who named it one of the "best titles of 2013".

Awards and recognition
 Tiptree Honor Book (2013)
 Nebula Award for Best Novel (2013, nominated)
 Washington State Book Award for Fiction (2014, winner)
 ALA GLBTRT Over the Rainbow Project list, Fiction (2014)
 ALA RUSA Notable Book, Historical Fiction (2014)
 Lambda Literary Award for Bisexual Fiction (2014, nominated)
 John W. Campbell Memorial Award for Best Science Fiction Novel (2014, nominated)
 Bisexual Book Award for Bisexual Fiction (2014, nominated)
 Guardian Not the Booker (2014, longlisted)

References

External links
 
 Gemaecce, Nicola Griffith's Hild research blog

Biographical novels
British historical novels
Novels set in the Middle Ages
Novels set in Anglo-Saxon England
Novels by Nicola Griffith
2013 British novels
Feminist novels
2013 LGBT-related literary works
Novels set in the Dark Ages
British LGBT novels
Farrar, Straus and Giroux books
2010s LGBT novels
Novels with bisexual themes
Female bisexuality in fiction